Edgewood, in Union Parish, Louisiana near Farmerville is a historic house built in 1902.  It is also known as Edgewood Plantation and, in 2017, is operated as a bed & breakfast inn.

It is a one-story frame house raised almost a full story above the ground, located on "a grassy rise" amongst oak trees on the shore of Lake D'Arbonne.

It includes Queen Anne and Eastlake architecture.

The house has an L-shaped plan.  Its parlor has a semi-hexagonal bay which is sheathed by a curving Eastlake gallery.  Its living room has an alcove inside a thin turret which protrudes above the roof line.  The roof line has seven gables, three of which are ornamented by scroll-sawn millwork.

References

External links
Edgewood Plantation Bed & Breakfast, official site

Houses on the National Register of Historic Places in Louisiana
Queen Anne architecture in Louisiana
Houses completed in 1902
Union Parish, Louisiana